Warnke is a surname. The word is of German origin. It means the descendant of little Waro (protection). The variants of the word include Werner, Warner, Wernere, Waerner and Warnken. The earliest record of the surname was found in Lower Saxony.

Persons with the surname
 Allan Warnke (1946–2021), Canadian politician
 Christine Warnke, American politician
 Curtis B. Warnke (1932–2006), American newspaper editor and politician
 David Warnke (born 1960), American professional football player
 Don Warnke (1920–1970), American professional basketball player
 Edmundo Warnke (born 1951), Chilean athlete
 Frank Warnke (1933–2011), American politician
 Georgia Warnke, American philosopher
 Herbert Warnke (1902–1975), East German trade unionist and politician
 Jürgen Warnke (1932–2013), German politician
 Martin Warnke (1937–2019), German art historian
 Mike Warnke (born 1946), American Christian evangelist and comedian
 Paul Warnke (1920–2001), American diplomat

See also
 Warnke (disambiguation)

References

Surnames of German origin
German words and phrases